Indiscretion is a 2016 American psychological thriller film written and directed by John Stewart Muller and starring Mira Sorvino, Cary Elwes, Christopher Backus, and Katherine McNamara. It was co-written and produced by Laura Boersma, Muller's partner at Santa Monica-based Granfalloon Productions. Its world broadcast premiere was July 23, 2016 on Lifetime.

Plot
Mira Sorvino stars as a politician's wife whose weekend fling with a tortured young artist leads to a dangerous obsession.

Cast

 Mira Sorvino as Dr. Veronica 'Ronnie' Simon
 Cary Elwes as Jake Simon
 Christopher Backus as Victor Bernard
 Katherine McNamara as Lizzy Simon
 Melora Walters as Dr. Harper
 LisaGay Hamilton as Karen Wyatt
 Shane Callahan as Neil
 Buck Taylor as Abe
 Marco St. John as Governor Wallace
 Jason Bayle as Marcus
 Liliana Tandon as Rebecca
 Brittany Clark as Ellie
 Lara Grice as Cathy
 Colby Arps as Josh
 Chris J. Floyd as Pete
 Xandra Clark as Riley Evans

Production
The film was shot in and around New Orleans.

References

External links
 
 
 
 

2016 television films
2016 films
American television films
American independent films
2016 psychological thriller films
2016 independent films
Films scored by Toby Chu
2010s English-language films
2010s American films